Emilio Turati (27 October 1858 – 23 September 1938) was an Italian entomologist who specialised in Lepidoptera. He is not to be confused with Ernesto Turati and Gianfranco Turati.

Count Emilio Turati wrote 67 scientific papers mainly on the Lepidoptera of Italy and the Mediterranean area. He described many new taxa. Turati was a friend of Attilio Fiori. His collection is shared between the Turin Museum of Natural History, Tyrolean State Museum and the Natural History Museum London.

References
Beer, S., 1991 [Turati, E.] Memorie della Società Entomologica Italiana, Genova 69 pp. 183–185
Conci, C.; Poggi, R., 1996 Iconography of Italian Entomologists, with essential biographical data. Memorie della Società Entomologica Italiana, Genova 75, S. 159-382, pp. 159–382, Portrait.

External links
 Zobodat

Italian entomologists
1938 deaths
1858 births